The Primera Categoría Serie B, shortened to Serie B or Primera B, is a professional football league in Ecuador. It is in the second tier of the Ecuadorian football league system. Currently contested by ten clubs, it operates a system of promotion and relegation with the top-flight Serie A and the bottom-level Segunda Categoría. The season runs from February to December in two stages. For sponsorship reasons, it is known as the LigaPro Banco Pichincha Pymes.

Serie B has been in place since 1971 and has been held on a yearly basis since (except 1973 and 1983–88), often holding two tournaments a year. The number of teams being promoted or relegated changed through the years because, like the Serie A, the format often changes on a seasonal basis. With the creation of LigaPro for the beginning of the 2019 season, the format consisted of two separate round robin stages. The top four teams with the most points after both stages were placed in a playoffs to determine the two teams who would earn promotion to Serie A the following season. Additionally, the two teams with the fewest points at the end of the season are relegated to the Segunda Categoría.

Thirty two different clubs have won the Serie B, but only twelve have won it multiple times. The most successful team and current champion is Técnico Universitario, who won their sixth title in 2017.

Current teams
There are currently ten teams in the 2021 Serie B.

List of champions

Titles by club

Titles by city

References

External links
Official webpage 
Serie B summary(SOCCERWAY)

 
2
Second level football leagues of South America